Fockeberg is a Schuttberg in the south of Leipzig Saxony, southeastern Germany, and is actually a pile of rubble left over from the bombing during World War II. 

Hills of Saxony